The Saudi Embassy in France is the diplomatic representation of the Kingdom of Saudi Arabia to the French Republic. Its ambassador since 30 December 2020 is Fahad M. Al Ruwaily

Building 
The Embassy is located at 92 rue de Courcelles in the 8th arrondissement of Paris.

Saudi ambassadors in France

Consular section 
The consular section of the embassy, charged among other visas, is located at 29 Rue des Graviers in Neuilly-sur-Seine.

Military office 
The embassy also has a military office at 87 rue de la Faisanderie in the 16th arrondissement of Paris.

Cultural Bureau 
The Saudi Cultural Bureau, located at 26 rue Murillo in the 8th arrondissement of Paris. It is responsible for academic exchanges and the promotion of Saudi culture.

History 
Earlier, the embassy was located at rue Andre Pascal in the 16th arrondissement of Paris, then 5 avenue Hoche in the 8th arrondissement of Paris.

On 5 September 1973 during the 4th summit of Non-Aligned Movement in Algiers, and a year to the day after the hostage crisis at the Munich Olympics, the embassy has been hostage by a Palestinian commando demanding the release of Abu Daoud, leader of the Black September organization and hostage organizer of Munich, then detained in Jordan.

See also 

 Ministry of Foreign Affairs (Saudi Arabia)
 List of diplomatic missions of Saudi Arabia
 France–Saudi Arabia relations

References

External links
 

France
Saudi Arabia
France–Saudi Arabia relations